Imsik Airport  is a regional airport that serves Bodrum, Turkey.  The airport has one asphalt-surface runway that is 1,570 metres long, and 30 metres wide.

References

Airports in Turkey